Edward Troughton FRS FRSE FAS (October 1753 – 12 June 1835) was a British instrument maker who was notable for making telescopes and other astronomical instruments.

Life

Troughton was born at Corney, Cumberland, the youngest of six children to Francis Troughton, a husbandman on a farm, and his wife, Mary Stable. Originally raised to tend animals, Edward went to London in 1773. He then served an apprenticeship with his uncle, John Troughton (b.c.1716) alongside his elder brother, also John Troughton, and in 1779 he became his business partner and soon established himself as the top maker of navigational, surveying and astronomical instruments in Britain. They were based at 136 Fleet Street in central London. Their shop was called the "Sign of the Orrery".

In 1795 he delivered what is now known as the Troughton Equatorial telescope to the Armagh Observatory, a 2-inch aperture refractor telescope mounted equatorially, and its first major instrument since its founding in 1790 (It survived into the 21st century also). He created the Groombridge Transit Circle in 1806, which Stephen Groombridge used to compile his star catalogue. He did not merely build instruments, but designed and invented new ones.

Troughton was awarded the Copley Medal of the Royal Society in 1809. He was elected a Fellow of the Royal Society in March 1810, a member of the American Philosophical Society in 1817, and a Fellow of the Royal Society of Edinburgh in 1822.

In 1826, after John's death and in failing health himself, he took on William Simms as a partner and the firm became known as Troughton & Simms.

Troughton was involved in a lawsuit against Sir James South, who was dissatisfied with the quality of an equatorial mounting that Troughton made for him.  Troughton sued for payment, and with informal legal counsel provided by Richard Sheepshanks, he prevailed.

Troughton was colour blind.

He died in London on 12 June 1835 and was buried in Kensal Green Cemetery in south London. He was unmarried and had no children.

Honours
Troughton Rocks in Antarctica are named after Edward Troughton. Troughton Road near to the location of the Charlton Troughton & Simms Mathematical Instrument Works was also named after Edward Troughton.

See also
List of astronomical instrument makers

References

External links

 
 Equatorial Telescope by Troughton
 MNRAS 3 (1836) 149

People associated with astronomy
1753 births
1835 deaths
British scientific instrument makers
Recipients of the Copley Medal
People from Cumberland
18th-century English people
19th-century English people
Fellows of the Royal Society
Burials at Kensal Green Cemetery